Constituent or constituency may refer to:

Politics
 An individual voter within an electoral district, state, community, or organization
 Advocacy group or constituency
 Constituent assembly
 Constituencies of Namibia

Other meanings
 Constituent (linguistics), a word or a group of words that function as a single unit within a hierarchical structure
 Constituent quark, a current quark with a notional "covering"

See also
 Ingredient
 Part (disambiguation)